The Old Oxford Mill near Oxford, Kansas was built in 1875.  It was listed on the National Register of Historic Places in 1982.

The mill is a three-story stone building,  in plan.  It has a steep gable roof.

The listing included three contributing buildings.

References

Industrial buildings and structures on the National Register of Historic Places in Kansas
Buildings and structures completed in 1875
National Register of Historic Places in Sumner County, Kansas
Grinding mills in Kansas
Grinding mills on the National Register of Historic Places